Sphaeriidae is a family of small to minute freshwater bivalve molluscs in the order Sphaeriida. In the US, they are commonly known as pea clams or fingernail clams.

Genera
Genera:
 Euperinae
 Byssanodonta d'Orbigny, 1846
 Eupera Bourguignat, 1854

 Sphaeriinae
 Afropisidium Kuiper, 1962
 Euglesa Jenyns, 1832
 Musculium Link, 1807
 Odhneripisidium Kuiper, 1962
 Pisidium C. Pfeiffer, 1821
 Sphaerium Scopoli, 1777

 fossils
 †Megasphaerioides Komatsu, J.-H. Chen & Q.-F. Wang, 2003
 †Protosphaerium Hocknull, 2000
 †Sphaericoncha Kolesnikov, 1980

Biology and ecology
Sphaeriidae are hermaphrodites with internal fertilization. Developing young are incubated within their mother (ovoviviparity), and newborn clams look like miniature copies of the adults.

Parasites and/or predators include the Sciomyzidae.

References

 
Bivalve families